Southampton F.C. Women are an English women's football club based in Southampton founded in 2017. The club will play in the FA Women's Championship in the 2022–23 season after winning promotion from the FA Women's National League South.

They are affiliated with Premier League side Southampton.

History

Other clubs
In 1970, Southampton Women's F.C. was formed by female fans of the men's Southampton F.C., but the two clubs were unaffiliated. Southampton Women's F.C. went on to great success in England, winning the WFA Cup (Women's FA Cup) eight times.

Another team, Southampton Saints Girls & Ladies F.C. were formed in 1979 as Red Star FC, who were founder members of the WFA Women's National League in 1991. The club adopted the name Southampton Saints Girls & Ladies on affiliating to Southampton F.C. in 1995, and was absorbed by Southampton F.C. in 2001. The club had financial difficulties in 2005; the men's senior side were relegated from the Premier League after 27 years of top-flight football, and Southampton F.C. withdrew support for the female side. Southampton Saints Girls & Ladies continued without major club support for another 14 years, before announcing their demise due to financial difficulties in July 2019.

Revival
By 2016 Southampton FC, under new ownership, saw the need for a competitive senior women's team as the profile of women's football in the UK grew. With the club's Regional Talent Centre, a Southampton Under-16 team was formed, and an Under-21 side in May 2017. The club formed an adult women's side for the 2017-18 season and were admitted to the Hampshire Women’s League Division 1. In March 2018, Southampton unsuccessfully applied to enter the FA Women's Championship (Tier 2). 

In June 2018, after winning the Hampshire Women's League Division 1, the senior team was listed for the following season's Southern Region Women's Football League First Division South. In July 2018, the club appointed former England international Marieanne Spacey-Cale as head of Women's and Girls' Football. Spacey-Cale has 91 senior England caps. 

In the 2018–19 season, the club in fact played in the Southern Region Premier Division, and won the title with a perfect record of 18 wins, earning promotion to the FA Women's National League Division One. They also beat Oxford City Women in the League Cup, achieving a domestic Double.

In both the 2019–20 and 2020–21 seasons, the club were top of the FA Women’s National League Division 1 South West at the point when the season was curtailed due to the coronavirus outbreak.

The club applied for, and were granted, upward club movement in the summer of 2021, being placed in the FA Women's National League Southern Premier Division for the 2021–22 season.

In the 2021–22 season, the club won the FA Women's National League Southern Premier Division to earn a chance to get promoted to the second-tier by beating the FA WNL Northern Premier Division champions in a play-off. On 21 May 2022, Southampton earned a first ever promotion to the FA Women's Championship by defeating Wolverhampton Wanderers 1-0 in the play-off.

Womens Championship
The 2022-23 Season  Southampton F.C start the season in their highest league to date after the Revival of the club. During the close season the women's side of the game went professional / full time.

Squad

Coaching Staff

|}

Youth Development

Southampton F.C. are well known for their youth development and scouting programmes. The club run a female-specific development programme, spanning talent clubs, summer camps, and the FA-approved Premier League Girls' Football Programme. In May 2017 the club announced the formation of a dedicated U-21 women's squad to complement their coaching programme and provide a feeder route into the women's first team.

Honours

Hampshire Women’s Football League Division 1
Champions (2017-18)

Southern Region Women's Football League Cup
Champions (2018–19)

Southern Region Women's Football League Premier Division
Champions (2018–19)

Hampshire FA Women's Challenge Cup
Runners up (2021)
Withdrew from Final due to fixture congestion (2022)

FA Women's National League South Southern Premier Division 
Champions (2021-22)

FA Women's National League Cup
Champions (2021/22)

FA Women's Championship Playoff
Champions (2021/22)

References

External links
 Official website

Women's football clubs in England
Football clubs in Hampshire
FA Women's National League teams
Southampton F.C.
2017 establishments in England